Richard Janelle (born 13 November 1947) was a member of the House of Commons of Canada. He was a secretary and coordinator by career.

Born in Warwick, Quebec, Janelle represented Quebec's Lotbinière electoral district at which he won a 16 October 1978 by-election. He served the remaining months of the 30th Canadian Parliament and was re-elected in the 1979 election.

Initially, he was a member of the Social Credit party, but during his term in the 31st Canadian Parliament, he joined the governing Progressive Conservative party. After the defeat of the short-lived Joe Clark administration, Janelle was defeated by Jean-Guy Dubois of the Liberal party in the 1980 election.

He made one further unsuccessful attempt to return to Parliament in a 4 May 1981 by-election in Lévis.

External links
 

1947 births
Living people
Members of the House of Commons of Canada from Quebec
Progressive Conservative Party of Canada MPs
Social Credit Party of Canada MPs
People from Centre-du-Québec